George Victor Schick (? in Chicago – December 31, 1964) was an American Lutheran biblical scholar and translator of Martin Luther.

His mother died when he was aged 2, and he was raised by his paternal grandparents. His grandfather was Rector George Schick who taught at Concordia Theological Seminary, Fort Wayne, Indiana from 1856 to 1914. George V. Schick graduated from Fort Wayne in 1904, then Johns Hopkins University in 1912. He joined the Fort Wayne faculty the year his grandfather retired, 1914.

Several of Schick's students did significant work. William Foxwell Albright and Jaroslav Pelikan studied under Schick in St. Louis.

He was professor of the Old Testament and Hebrew at Concordia Seminary in Clayton, Missouri a suburb of St. Louis till his death. After 1956 was engaged in translating Luther's Lectures on Genesis from Latin into English for the 55-volume American edition of Luther's Works.

Works
 The stems dûm and damám in Hebrew (1913)
 First year Hebrew exercises Concordia (1950)
 Translator: Luther Lectures on Genesis vol.1-4, vol.5 uncompleted, of 8 vols planned. (1968)

References

1964 deaths
American Lutherans
American translators
Year of birth missing
Lutheran Church–Missouri Synod people